Jason Brown  is an American writer who writes primarily about Maine and New England. He has published two collections of short stories and has a third forthcoming in October 2019. His fiction has appeared in magazines and anthologies including The New Yorker , Harper's , The Atlantic  and The Best American Short Stories.

Early life and education
Brown grew up in Maine. He earned an MFA in creative writing from Cornell University. In 1996, he received a Stegner Fellowship to study creative writing at Stanford University.

Career

Driving the Heart
After its initial publication in the Mississippi Review, his story "Driving the Heart" was selected for The Best American Short Stories 1996. The story later appeared in the 2012 collection Boston Noir 2: The Classics.

In 1999, Brown's debut collection was published. The New York Times described Driving the Heart and Other Stories as "bleak yet penetrating," adding that "each of Brown's elegant stories echoes with the same quiet despair." The 13 stories are mostly set in and around Portland, Maine, involving characters affected by tragic experiences past and present. Driving the Heart was a starred review in Publishers Weekly, where it was called an "extraordinary debut collection."

Why the Devil Chose New England for His Work
Brown's second collection of 11 loosely linked short stories, Why the Devil Chose New England for His Work: Stories, came out in 2007. The 11 stories set in the fictional town of Vaughn in central Maine are linked by geography and tone, with "weary, complicated souls" of all ages. With the changes in narrative point of view within some of the stories, Brown has said he was influenced by the narration in the films of Terrence Malick – Days of Heaven and The Thin Red Line in particular. Some of the stories were originally published in magazines including Harper's, Epoch, Open City and The Atlantic. The book was given an A− by Entertainment Weekly, and was a starred review in Publishers Weekly. The Los Angeles Times called it "an exceptionally beautiful and devastating book." It was a suggested summer reading by NPR in 2009. The New Yorker said, "The narrators of Brown’s second book of stories are mostly watchers—witnesses to sordid events in the fictional town of Vaughn, Maine. Through their eyes, the familiar routines of small-town life are transmogrified into emblematic ugliness. Some of the stories deal with Maine’s twin preoccupations with boats and lumber, but the strongest anatomize the town with stunning emotional precision."

Three of Brown's stories were named among the Best American Short Stories series "100 Other Distinguished Stories" in 1997, 2005 and 2010. His story "Wintering Over" was published in The Southern Review in 2012.

A Faithful But Melancholy Account of Several Barbarities Lately Committed
Brown's third collection of stories, a novel in stories, chronicles the comic misfortunes of the Howland family of Maine published in October 2019 as the first collection in a new short fiction series created by Missouri Review Books.

Creative Nonfiction
The Wrong Jason Brown The New Yorker

Teaching
Brown previously taught creative writing at Stanford University as a Jones lecturer, and at the University of Arizona's creative writing MFA program. He is currently an associate professor at the University of Oregon's creative writing MFA program.

Honors and awards (selected)
 Best American Essays, 2022, for "The Wrong Jason Brown"
 Maine Literary Award for A Faithful But Melancholy Account of Several Barbarities Lately Committed
 Best American Short Stories, 2020
 2019 Pushcart Prize XLIV
 NPR summer pick for Why the Devil Chose New England For His Work.
 Best American Short Stories 1996 pick for "Driving the Heart"
 Jeffrey E Smith Editor's Prize from the Missouri Review, 2017
 Stegner Fellowship in Fiction, Stanford University, 1996-98
 MacDowell Colony Fellowship, 2002
 Corporation of Yaddo Fellowship, 2002
 Pushcart Prize special mention for "Why the Devil Chose New England For His Work", 2009
 Glenna Lusche Award for "Flood", 2009
 Mississippi Review Fiction Prize for "Driving the Heart," 1995
 Saltonstall Foundation Grant

Bibliography

Short story collections
 Driving the Heart and Other Stories (W. W. Norton & Company, 1999)
 Why the Devil Chose New England for His Work: Stories (Open City/Grove Atlantic, 2007)
 A Faithful But Melancholy Account of Several Barbarities Lately Committed: A Novel in Stories Missouri Review Books, Oct, 2019)

Stories (selected)
 "The Last Voyage of the Alice B Toklas" – The Pushcart Anthology XLIV
 "Driving the Heart" – The Best American Short Stories 1996 (ed. John Edgar Wideman, Houghton Mifflin, 1996); Boston Noir 2: The Classics (ed. Dennis Lehane, Mary Cotton and Jaime Clarke, Akashic Books, 2012)
 "Afternoon of the Sassanoa" – The Atlantic (April 1999) 
 "She" – Harper's (March 2001) 
 "A Faithful But Melancholy Account of Several Barbarities Lately Committed" – Sewanee Review (2019)
 "North" – Open City (Issue 19, June 2003) 
 "Instructions to the Living from the Condition of the Dead" – Missouri Review (2017)
 "Dark Room" – StoryQuarterly (Issue 42, 2006)
 "Life During Peacetime" – TriQuarterly (March 2006) 
 "The last Voyage of the Alice B. Toklas" – Missouri Review (2018) 
 "Why the Devil Chose New England for His Work" – Epoch (2007)
 "Wintering Over" – The Southern Review (Winter 2012)

Articles
 "Matinicus" – Maine Magazine, June 2010
 "Mission Impossible: The Quest to Prosecute ISIS for Genocide," Construction Literary Magazine" – Construction Literary Magazine, March 2019
 "If I did not Protest, no one would" – Salon, August 2015
 "Digital Literacy For Women and Girls in Afghanistan" – Salon , May 2015
 "If I Teach Them, No One Can Stop Them" – Salon , February 2015
 "One Girl Can Be Silenced, But A Nation Of Girls Telling Their Stories Becomes Free" – Salon , February 2015

References

External links 
 

Living people
21st-century American novelists
Novelists from Maine
People from Hallowell, Maine
Bowdoin College alumni
Cornell University alumni
Stegner Fellows
University of Oregon faculty
American male novelists
American male short story writers
American short story writers
21st-century American short story writers
21st-century American male writers
Novelists from Oregon
Year of birth missing (living people)